Live at Vallhall: Homecoming is a live video album by Norwegian band A-ha, released on 5 November 2001 by Warner Music Vision. It was filmed during the band's two concerts at Vallhall Arena in Oslo on 24 and 25 March 2001.

Track listing

Live at Vallhall
"Minor Earth Major Sky" (Magne Furuholmen, Paul Waaktaar-Savoy)
"The Sun Never Shone That Day" (Lauren Savoy, Paul Waaktaar-Savoy)
"Little Black Heart" (Magne Furuholmen, Paul Waaktaar-Savoy)
"I've Been Losing You" (Paul Waaktaar-Savoy)
"Manhattan Skyline" (Magne Furuholmen, Paul Waaktaar-Savoy)
"Thought That It Was You" (Morten Harket, Ole Sverre-Olsen)
"I Wish I Cared" (Magne Furuholmen)
"Cry Wolf" (Magne Furuholmen, Paul Waaktaar-Savoy)
"Mary Ellen Makes the Moment Count" (Paul Waaktaar-Savoy)
"Stay on These Roads (Magne Furuholmen, Morten Harket, Paul Waaktaar-Savoy)
"Early Morning" (Magne Furuholmen, Paul Waaktaar-Savoy)
"You'll Never Get Over Me" (Paul Waaktaar-Savoy)
"Velvet" (Lauren Savoy, Paul Waaktaar-Savoy)
"The Sun Always Shines on T.V." (Paul Waaktaar-Savoy)
"The Living Daylights" (John Barry, Paul Waaktaar-Savoy)
"Hunting High and Low" (Paul Waaktaar-Savoy)
"Summer Moved On" (Paul Waaktaar-Savoy)
"Crying in the Rain" (Carole King, Howard Greenfield)
"Take On Me" (Magne Furuholmen, Morten Harket, Paul Waaktaar-Savoy)

Bonus Disc – Live at Grimstad (not included in all versions)
"Stay on These Roads (Magne Furuholmen, Morten Harket, Paul Waaktaar-Savoy)"
"Early Morning (Magne Furuholmen, Paul Waaktaar-Savoy)"
"You'll Never Get Over Me (Paul Waaktaar-Savoy)"
"Summer Moved On (Paul Waaktaar-Savoy)"
"The Living Daylights (John Barry, Paul Waaktaar-Savoy)" (taken from Vallhall, Oslo 25 March 2001)
"Angel" (taken from Vallhall Oslo, 24 March 2001)

Personnel
 Paul Waaktaar-Savoy – guitars, backing vocals
 Magne Furuholmen – keyboards, backing vocals
 Morten Harket – vocals
 Christer Karlsson – keyboards
  – bass
  – drums
 Anneli Drecker – backing vocals
 Dinamo Live As., a-ha  – producer

References

2001 live albums
2001 video albums
A-ha albums
Live video albums
Warner Music Vision live albums
Warner Music Vision video albums